= Andrea Neto =

Andrea Neto from the TU Delft- Delft University of Technology, Delft, Netherlands was named Fellow of the Institute of Electrical and Electronics Engineers (IEEE) in 2016 for contributions to dielectric lens antennas and wideband arrays.
